Delayed Justice is a South Korean television series starring Kwon Sang-woo, Bae Seong-woo (replaced by Jung Woo-sung midway through the drama), Kim Ju-hyeon and Jung Woong-in. It aired on SBS TV from October 30, 2020 to January 23, 2021 every Friday and Saturday at 22:00 (KST). The director and producer of this drama told the media in a press conference that it is based on real-life actual events, though the incidents, names and places are altered.

Synopsis
A high school graduate yet full of zest and keen sense of justice managed to pass the bar examination to be a qualified barrister-at-law against miscarriage of justice, an atypical but empathetic senior reporter and his passionate junior reporter, teamed up to defend and fight for judicial victims who are falsely accused, wrongfully convicted or malicious prosecution.

Inspired by true stories of real-life lawyer Park Joon-young and journalist Park Sang-kyu, who succeeded in obtaining retrials for people who had been wrongfully convicted, wherein a 1999 case in which three innocent people were convicted of robbery and murder, and in the 2000 murder of a taxi driver at the Yakchon five-way intersection in Iksan, North Jeolla Province.

Cast

Main
 Kwon Sang-woo as Park Tae-yong
 Park Sang-hoon as young Park Tae-yong
A public defender. Born in a rural town, he managed to pass the bar exam without attending college. Full of zest and keen sense of justice, he became a defence barrister, advocate and solicitor to defend and fight for judicial victims who are falsely accused, wrongfully convicted or malicious prosecution.
 Bae Seong-woo / Jung Woo-sung as Park Sam-soo
Graduated from a lesser-known college and in spite of his atypical personality, he is an competent and empathetic reporter.
 Kim Ju-hyeon as Lee Yoo-kyung
A passionate newbie reporter. She admires her senior Park Sam-soo, albeit sometimes frustrated by his atypical work antics. 
 Jung Woong-in as Jang Yoon-seok
A senior prosecutor. He was born in the rural countryside, yet rose quickly in his government legal service career due to his public relations and lobbying skills.

Supporting
 Kim Eung-soo as Kang Cheol-woo
 Jo Sung-ha as Jo Ki-soo
 Kim Kap-soo as Kim Hyung-chun
 Lee Won-jong as Han Sang-man
 Ahn Si-ha as Hwang Min-kyung
 Park Ji-il as Kim Byung-dae
 Lee Soon-won as Kim Gwi-hyun
 Kim Hye-hwa as Lee Jin-sil 
 Lee Cheol-min as Ahn Young-kwon
 Jeon Jin-gi as Tak Jae-hyung
 Cha Soon-bae as Moon Joo-hyung

Special appearances
 Lee Jung-jae as Jang Tae-joon
 Lee Elijah as Yoon Hye-won
 Lee Jong-hyuk as Heo Sung-yoon (ep. 18-20)

Ratings

Notes

References

External links
  
 
 

Seoul Broadcasting System television dramas
Korean-language television shows
2020 South Korean television series debuts
2021 South Korean television series endings
South Korean crime television series
South Korean legal television series
Television series by Next Entertainment World